Aulon may refer to the following places and jurisdictions :

Places

Greece  
 Aulon (Arcadia), a settlement in ancient Arcadia 
 Aulon (Attica), a settlement in ancient Attica
 Aulon (Crete), a settlement in ancient Crete
 Aulon (Messenia), a settlement in ancient Messenia
 Aulon (Naxos), a settlement in ancient Naxos
 Avlonari, a city formerly known as Aulon, on Euboea

Albania 
 The Greek name of the city of Vlorë.

France 
 Aulon, Creuse, a commune of the Creuse département
 Aulon, Haute-Garonne, a commune of the Haute-Garonne département
 Aulon, Hautes-Pyrénées, a commune of the Hautes-Pyrénées département

Religious jurisdictions 
the former Diocese of Aulon (Hellas) with the above see, now a Latin Catholic titular see as Aulon (Aulonensis)
 the former Diocese of Aulon (Epirus) with the above see, now a Latin Catholic titular see as Aulon (Aulonitanus)